Tommaso de Rosa (1621 – 10 October 1695) was a Roman Catholic prelate who served as Bishop of Policastro (1695–1679) and Bishop of Sant'Angelo dei Lombardi e Bisaccia (1662–1679).

Biography
Tommaso de Rosa  was born in Cava, Italy in 1621. On 16 January 1662, he was appointed during the papacy of Pope Alexander VII as Bishop of Sant'Angelo dei Lombardi e Bisaccia. On 22 January 1662, he was consecrated bishop by Giulio Cesare Sacchetti, Cardinal-Bishop of Sabina, with Ottaviano Carafa, Titular Archbishop of Patrae, and Carlo de' Vecchi, Bishop Emeritus of Chiusi, serving as co-consecrators. On 8 May 1679, he was appointed during the papacy of Pope Innocent XI as Bishop of Policastro. He served as Bishop of Policastro until his death on 10 October 1695.

References

External links and additional sources
 (for Chronology of Bishops) 
 (for Chronology of Bishops) 

17th-century Italian Roman Catholic bishops
Bishops appointed by Pope Alexander VII
Bishops appointed by Pope Innocent XI
1621 births
1695 deaths